Satyagraha (Sanskrit सत्याग्रह, satyāgraha "insistence on truth") is a 1979 opera in three acts for orchestra, chorus and soloists, composed by Philip Glass, with a libretto by Glass and Constance DeJong.

Loosely based on the life of Mahatma Gandhi, it forms the second part of Glass's "Portrait Trilogy" of operas about men who changed the world, which also includes Einstein on the Beach and Akhnaten.

Glass's style can broadly be described as minimalist. The work is scored for 2 sopranos, 2 mezzo-sopranos, 2 tenors, a baritone, 2 basses, a large SATB chorus, and an orchestra of strings and woodwinds only, no brass or percussion. Principal roles are Sonja Schlesin, Mahatma  Gandhi, Hermann Kallenbach and Parsi Rustomji.

The title refers to Gandhi's concept of nonviolent resistance to injustice, Satyagraha, and the text, from the Bhagavad Gita, is sung in the original Sanskrit. In performance, translation is usually provided in supertitles.

Roles

Performance history

The opera premiered in North America at the Artpark in Lewiston, New York, on July 29, 1981. That production was mounted later that year at the Brooklyn Academy of Music.  The opera was also staged that same year by the Stuttgart Opera (which went on to perform the complete trilogy in 1990); this production was taped during its revival in 1983 and released on video.

The Lyric Opera of Chicago presented the first production by a major international opera company on September 28, 1987, at the Civic Opera House. Douglas Perry sang the role of Gandhi.

The UK premiere was a joint production by Bath Spa University and Frome Community College in the theatre of Kingswood School in Bath in 1997.

Performance by San Francisco Opera at the War Memorial Opera House in 1989 

 staged a new production of the opera in 2004 at the Theater Bonn, Germany, with a revival in 2013, with Ulrich Windfuhr conducting the Beethoven Orchester Bonn.

A new staging by the English National Opera and Improbable theatre, co-produced by the Metropolitan Opera, opened in London in April 2007 and in New York in April 2008. It was revived in London in February 2010 and in New York in November 2011; the New York performance on November 19 was part of the Met Opera: Live in HD series.  It aired on Great Performances from PBS in 2012, Season 39 Episode 19 on March 22 and March 25. The Metropolitan Opera's 2011 production was streamed online on June 21 and November 1, 2020.

On September 16, 2014, a new production was staged at the Ekaterinburg State Academic Opera in Russia. The creative team included Thaddeus Strassberger (direction and scenic design), Mattie Ullrich (costume design) and Oliver von Dohnányi (conductor).

On 18 November 2018, Vlaamse Opera premiered a production by director and choreographer Sidi Larbi Cherkaoui, together with stage designer Henrik Ahr and costume designer Jan-Jan Van Essche

Synopsis
The opera is in three acts, each referencing a major related cultural figure.

Act 1
Leo Tolstoy

 On the Kuru Field of Justice
 Tolstoy Farm (1910)
 The Vow (1906)

Act 2
Rabindranath Tagore

 Confrontation and Rescue (1896)
 Indian Opinion (1906)
 Protest (1908)

Act 3
Martin Luther King Jr.
The Newcastle March (1913)

Recordings
 Sheryl Woods (Mrs. Naidoo), Douglas Perry (M.K. Gandhi); Christopher Keene (Conductor), New York City Opera orchestra and chorus. 1984 (Sony)
 D. Anzolini; Metropolitan Opera orchestra and chorus. 2021 (Orange Machine Music)

See also
List of artistic depictions of Mahatma Gandhi

References

External links
 
 Satyagraha at PhilipGlass.com
 "The Truth Force at the Met", Daniel Mendelsohn's review of Satyagraha from The New York Review of Books
 "В Екатеринбурге поставили «Сатьяграху»" (Ekaterinburg presents Satyagraha) by Gyulyara Sadiq-zade, Vedomosti, 18 September 2014 

1980 operas
Cultural depictions of Mahatma Gandhi
Minimalist operas
Operas
Operas set in the 20th century
Operas set in India
Operas based on real people
Operas by Philip Glass
Philip Glass albums
Political operas
Sanskrit-language operas